The John M. Stone Cotton Mill is a building in Starkville, Mississippi listed on the National Register of Historic Places. Built in 1902, it was a cotton mill named for John Marshall Stone. It was renamed the E.E. Cooley Building after being purchased by Mississippi State University in 1965; afterward, the building was used for almost fifty years to house the university's physical plant. The building reopened in 2015 as an event center named The Mill at MSU.

References

External links
 The Mill at MSU

Buildings and structures in Oktibbeha County, Mississippi
National Register of Historic Places in Oktibbeha County, Mississippi